Paulina Lizeth Solís Echeverría (born 13 March 1996), is a Mexican professional football Dedefender who last played for UANL of the Liga MX Femenil.

Honours

Club
UANL
Liga MX Femenil: Clausura 2018
Liga MX Femenil: Clausura 2019

References

External links
 
 
 Paulina Lizeth Solís Echeverría at Tigres UANL Femenil  (archived)
 

1996 births
Living people
Mexican women's footballers
Footballers from Jalisco
Liga MX Femenil players
Tigres UANL (women) footballers
Mexico women's international footballers
Women's association football defenders
Mexican footballers